Let's Play Two is a live album and concert film by American alternative rock band Pearl Jam. The album was released on September 29, 2017, with the concert film being released on November 17, 2017. The footage and songs were recorded at the band's shows at Wrigley Field during their 2016 tour.

Track listing
Audio

Video
 "Low Light"
 "Better Man"
 "Elderly Woman Behind the Counter in a Small Town"
 "Last Exit"
 "Lightning Bolt"
 "Black, Red, Yellow"
 "Black
 "Corduroy"
 "Given to Fly"
 "Jeremy"
 "Inside Job"
 "Go
 "Crazy Mary"
 "Release"
 "Alive"
 "All the Way"
 "I've Got a Feeling"

Bonus tracks
"Black"
 "Mind Your Manners"
 "Masters of War"
 "Rearviewmirror"
 "Immortality"
 "Lukin'" (hidden track)

Personnel
Pearl Jam
 Jeff Ament – bass guitar
 Matt Cameron – drums
 Stone Gossard – rhythm guitar
 Mike McCready – lead guitar
 Eddie Vedder – lead vocals, rhythm guitar

Additional musicians
 Boom Gaspar – Hammond organ

Technical personnel
 Ed Brooks – mastering
 John Burton – recording
 Danny Clinch – liner notes and photos
 Brett Eliason – mixing
 Joe Spix – layout and design

Charts

References

2017 live albums
2017 soundtrack albums
2017 video albums
Concert film soundtracks
Pearl Jam live albums
Pearl Jam video albums